In Iowa, midterm elections for the state's five congressional seats took place November 7, 2006. Each race was contested, pitting the winners of the Republican and Democratic primaries conducted June 6.

The Democratic party won three of the five seats up for grabs. In the 2nd district, 30-year incumbent Jim Leach, a Republican, was unseated by newcomer Dave Loebsack, a Democrat.

The winners served from January 3, 2007 to January 3, 2009.

Overview

District 1

Regarded as one of the more hotly contested races in the nation, Republican nominee Mike Whalen of Bettendorf, the operator of the Heart of America Restaurants and Inns (HOARI) chain, took on Democratic candidate Bruce Braley, an attorney from Waterloo. The seat had been vacated when incumbent Jim Nussle announced his run for Iowa governor.

In the Democratic primary, Braley defeated Rick Dickinson, Bill Gluba and Denny Heath. Whalen got the GOP nod over Bill Dix and Brian Kennedy.

Following an election that was peppered with negative attack ads from both sides, Braley defeated Whalen by a solid margin.

Braley's victory meant that, for the first time since 1976, a Democrat will be serving the district.

District 2

When the Iowa Secretary of State's office posted its list of primary candidates online in March, there was no Democratic candidate. . However, Dave Loebsack of Mount Vernon, a political science professor at Cornell College, received write-in votes in the June 6 primary to become the Democratic nominee . Incumbent Jim Leach was the sole GOP candidate in the primary.

The campaign eventually heated up, as Loebsack was hoping to ride what he viewed as voter discontent with the Bush administration. Leach supporters continued to point to his strong integrity and status as one of the most liberal Republicans in the House.

On election night, Loebsack stunned many political observers by defeating Leach by a thin margin. Leach's defeat made him the most senior House member to lose re-election in 2006 and the most senior member to lose re-election since 42-year incumbent Jack Brooks lost to Steve Stockman in the 1994 Republican Revolution.

District 3

Five-term incumbent Leonard Boswell, a Democrat from Des Moines, took on Republican challenger Jeff Lamberti of Ankeny, a two-term state senator from the 35th District and the GOP's Senate leader. Both candidates were uncontested in the June 6 primary.

Like in the first congressional district, the third district race was characterized by negative attack advertising and attention from national committees seeking to elect their candidate of choice.

Boswell ultimately took advantage of the strong Democratic wave sweeping across the country and defeated Lamberti to win a sixth term.

District 4

Seven-term Republican incumbent Tom Latham of Alexander faced Democratic nominee Selden Spencer, a neurologist from Huxley. Both candidates were unopposed in the June 6 primary. Although quiet by comparison to other races in Iowa, the Iraq War was a major point of contention between the candidates.

Though some political analysts expected the race to be a tough one, Latham defeated Spencer by a solid margin to win a seventh term.

District 5

Republican Steve King of Kiron, a two-term incumbent, faced Democratic nominee Joyce Schulte of Creston. Schulte had defeated Robert Chambers in the June 6 primary, while King was unopposed.

In the November 7 election, King defeated Schulte in a small landslide to win another term.

References

See also
 Iowa gubernatorial election, 2006

Iowa

2006
2006 Iowa elections